Al Kanfoudi is a 1978 Moroccan film directed by Nabyl Lahlou. The film was one of Lahlou's few projects to receive CCM funding.

Synopsis 
Hamid Kanfoudi, an orchestra conductor, wins the lottery. Contrary to his beliefs and expectations, he sees no improvement in his life.

Cast 

 Nabyl Lahlou
 Mustapha Mounir
 Hammadi Ammor
 Mohamed Miftah

References 

1978 films
Moroccan drama films
1970s Arabic-language films
Films directed by Nabyl Lahlou